Bosnia (/Bosona), in the Early Middle Ages to early High Middle Ages was territorially and politically defined entity, governed at first by knez and then by a ruler with the ban title, possibly from at least 838 AD. Situated, broadly, around upper and middle course of the Bosna river, between valleys of the Drina river on the east and the Vrbas river on the west, which comprise a wider area of central and eastern modern-day Bosnia and Herzegovina.

Geography

The very nucleus where the first Bosnian state emerged and had developed is Visoko valley, surrounding a wider area of modern-day town of Visoko.
The early Bosnia, according to Vego and Mrgić, as well as Hadžijahić and Anđelić, was situated, broadly, around the Bosna river, between its upper and the middle course: in the south to north direction between the line formed by its source and the Prača river in the south, and the line formed by the Drinjača river and the Krivaja river (from Olovo, downstream to town of Maglaj), and Vlašić mountain in the north, and in the west to east direction between the Rama-Vrbas line stretching from the Neretva to Pliva in the west, and the Drina in the east, which is a wider area of central and eastern modern-day Bosnia and Herzegovina.
Confirmation of its emergence and territorial distribution comes from historiographical interpretation of Bar's Chronicle in modern and post-modern scholarship, which situate the state around the Upper Bosna river and the Upper Vrbas river, including Uskoplje, Pliva and Luka. This also suggest that this distribution from the Bosna river valley into the Vrbas river valley is the earliest recorded. These three small parishes will later become a quintessence for emergence of Donji Kraji county, before they were reclaimed as Kotromanić's demesne, after 1416 and death of Hrvoje Vukčić.

History

The western Balkans had been reconquered from "barbarians" by Roman Emperor Justinian (r. 527–565). Sclaveni (Slavs) raided the western Balkans, including Bosnia, in the 6th century. The first mention of a Bosnian entity comes from the De Administrando Imperio (DAI in further text), which mention Bosnia (/Bosona) as a "small/little land" or a "small country", /horion Bosona, positioned in the upper course of the Bosna river, settled by Slavs who in time created their own unit with a ruler calling himself a Bosnian.

Historical and archaeological information on early medieval Bosnia remains inadequate. According to DAI, Bosnia included two inhabited towns, Katera and Desnik. Katera may have been situated in the vicinity of modern-day Kotor Varoš, the potential site could be Bobac or Bobos, however, site only includes late medieval findings to date. Desnik remains wholly unidentified, but was thought to be near Dešanj. Hadžijahić wholly rejected the information about location of the two towns in Bosnia, arguing that the Greek preposition in the sentence is often erroneously translated (as "in" instead of "toward"), referring to two Serbian towns toward land of Bosnia. Relja Novaković also questioned why there was an additional mention of a land with own cities if they should be part of Serbia, concluding that Bosnia almost always was a separate country. Francis Dvornik stated to be, "most probable-and this is accepted by most historians of the period", initially formed as part of Croatia and later in mid-10th century was ruled by Serbia. 

If DAI'''s kastra oikoumena does not designate inhabited towns, but ecclesiastical centers instead (in 6th century is mentioned Bestoen bishopric with several episcopal centers that belonged to Salonitan Archdiocese), as theorized by late Tibor Živković, the two towns in question might be Bistua (Zenica or Vitez) and Martar (probably Konjic). The existence of such centers is argued by Živković as evidence it was an independent state before 822. By the late 9th and early 10th century, Bosnia was mostly Christianized by Latin priests from the Dalmatian coastal towns, though remote pockets remained unreached. After the East–West Schism (1054) the bishopric of Bosnia was Roman Catholic under jurisdiction of the Archbishop of Split (since the 12th century under Roman Catholic Diocese of Dubrovnik).

Northern and Northeastern Bosnia was captured by Carolingian Franks in the early 9th century and remained under their jurisdiction until 870s. In what is now eastern Herzegovina and Montenegro, semi-independent localities emerged under Serbian rule. In the 910s Petar of Serbia annexed entire Eastern Bosnia by defeating local Slavic lord Tišemir of Bosnia, and pushing into Zahumlje came into conflict with Michael of Zahumlje. Croatian king Tomislav reintegrated parts of Western and Northern Bosnia, battling the Bulgarians in the Bosnian highlands (926). In 949, a civil war broke out in Croatia leading to the conquest of Bosnia by Časlav, but after his death in 960s, it was retaken by Michael Krešimir II of Croatia, or became politically independent. Bulgaria briefly subjugated Bosnia at the turn of the 10th century, after which followed period of Byzantine rule. In the 11th century, Bosnia was briefly part of the state of Duklja (predecessor of Montenegro). In 1019 Byzantine Emperor Basil II forced the Serb and Croat rulers to acknowledge Byzantine sovereignty, though this had little impact over the governance of Bosnia until the end of 11th century, for periods of time being governed by Croats or Serbs to the East. A later political link to Croatia will be observed "by the Croatian title ban from the earliest times".

Based on semi-mythological Chronicle of the Priest of Duklja (13th century), according to some scholars the earliest known ruler of Bosnia was Ratimir in 838 AD. According to later Annales Ragusini (14-17th century), the death of childless Stiepan in 871 was followed by 17 years war which was ended by Croatian ruler Bereslav's conquest of Bosnia, while in 972 Bosnian ruler was killed and land conquered by certain Sigr. Ducha d'Albania, but another ruler of the lineage of Moravia de Harvati and related to previous Bosnian ruler, expelled Sigr. Ducha'' and united Bosnia.

In the early middle ages, Fine Jr. and Malcolm believe that westernmost parts of modern-day Bosnia and Herzegovina were part of Duchy of Croatia, while the easternmost parts were part of Principality of Serbia, although, the harsh and usually inaccessible elevated terrains of the country most likely never came under direct control of either of the two neighboring Slavic states, and instead always had its own distinct political governance. This is reinforced by the Byzantine writer Cinnamus, who wrote: 

Regarding the ethnic identity of the inhabitants of Bosnia until 1180, Noel Malcolm concludes "it cannot be answered, for two reasons":

During the mid-12th century, the Banate of Bosnia emerged under its first ruler Ban Borić. After Ban Kulin Bosnia was by practical means an independent state, but that was constantly challenged by Hungarian kings who tried to reestablish its authority.

See also

 Usora (region)
 Soli (region)
 Visoko during the Middle Ages

References

Sources 

 
 
 
 
 
 
 
 
 
 
 
 
 
 
 
 
 

Medieval Bosnian state
7th-century establishments in Europe
1150s disestablishments in Europe